Jarah Al Ateeqi (born 15 October 1981) is a Kuwaiti footballer who is a midfielder for the Kuwaiti Premier League club Al Kuwait.

International goals

Honours
Kuwait SC
Kuwaiti Premier League: 2006, 2007, 2008
Kuwait Emir Cup: 2009
Kuwait Crown Prince Cup: 2008, 2010, 2011
AFC Cup: 2009

Kuwait national football team
2010 West Asian Football Federation Championship
2010 Gulf Cup of Nations

See also
 List of men's footballers with 100 or more international caps

References

1981 births
Living people
Kuwaiti footballers
2011 AFC Asian Cup players
FIFA Century Club
Sportspeople from Kuwait City
Association football midfielders
AFC Cup winning players
Kuwait international footballers
Kuwait Premier League players
Kuwait SC players